Sabre Army Heliport  is a military use heliport located at Fort Campbell, seven nautical miles (13 km) northwest of the central business district of Clarksville, in Montgomery County, Tennessee, United States. Owned by the United States Army, it has one runway designated 4/22 with a concrete surface measuring 4,451 by 109 feet (1,357 x 33 m).

History 
Sabre AHP was built in 1976 to accommodate UH-1 "Huey" helicopters. In 1998, the U.S. Army conducted a study of the heliport at the direction of the U.S. Congress. $19.5 million was appropriated for improvements including widening the landing area to accommodate UH-60 "Blackhawk" helicopters. The Lane Construction Corp. was selected in 2000 to construct a new  concrete runway and a  parallel taxiway, along with three connecting taxiways, a visual flight rule helipad and runway lighting.

See also 
 Campbell Army Airfield

References

External links 
 Aerial photo as of 27 March 1992 from USGS The National Map via MSR Maps
 
 
 

United States Army airfields
Military installations in Tennessee
Airports in Tennessee
Buildings and structures in Montgomery County, Tennessee
Military heliports in the United States
1976 establishments in Tennessee
Military installations established in 1976